The women's 800 metres at the 2012 IPC Athletics European Championships was held at Stadskanaal Stadium from 24–28 July.

Medalists
Results given by IPC Athletics.

Results
Final

See also
List of IPC world records in athletics

References

800 metres
2012 in women's athletics
800 metres at the World Para Athletics European Championships